Loosey the Moose is a sculpture of a moose in Park City, Utah, United States.

History
The sculpture was donated to City Hall in 2018. Someone outfitted the statue with a face mask during the COVID-19 pandemic.

See also

 Franz the Bear

References

Buildings and structures in Park City, Utah
Mammals in art
Outdoor sculptures in Utah
Statues in Utah